Killer Instinct (also known as Deadly Observation) is a 1988 American made-for-television drama film starring Melissa Gilbert and Woody Harrelson, directed by Waris Hussein.

Plot 
Charlie is a young attorney assigned to the case of Freddy, a violent and uncontrollable man, about to be released from the hospital. Charlie doesn't think it is a good idea for a man with mental problems to be released and tries to prove that, with the help of Dr. Lisa DaVito. Her career is in jeopardy when he is eventually released and immediately committed a murder.

Cast
Melissa Gilbert as Dr. Lisa DaVito
Woody Harrelson as Charlie Long
Lane Smith as Dr. Butler
Kevin Conroy as Dr. Steven Nelson

References

External links

1988 television films
1988 films
1988 drama films
NBC network original films
Films about violence
Films directed by Waris Hussein
Films scored by Paul Chihara
ITC Entertainment films
American drama television films
1980s English-language films
1980s American films